Logoly State Park is one of the 52 state parks of the Arkansas State Parks System, located in the Gulf Coastal Plain,  north of Magnolia,  east of McNeil, off U.S. Route 79 on Loyola Road (County Road 47) in southwestern Arkansas in the United States. The  park surrounds an area of mineral springs that have been known for over a century.

See also

 List of Arkansas state parks

References

External links

Parks in Columbia County, Arkansas
State parks of Arkansas